Amra Ram Choudhary (born 10 April 1943) is a former minister of revenue in the Government of Rajasthan and a Bharatiya Janata Party MLA from Pachpadra in Barmer district. He is from Balotra, Rajasthan. He is the former Home Minister of Rajasthan.

References

Living people
People from Barmer district
Members of the Rajasthan Legislative Assembly
Bharatiya Janata Party politicians from Rajasthan
1943 births